Marie-Hélène Descamps (5 July 1938 – 2 August 2020) was a French politician and Member of the European Parliament for Central France. She was a member of the Union for a Popular Movement, part of the European People's Party.

References
 Marie-Hélène DESCAMPS. European Parliament. Accessed 2011-01-30.

1938 births
2020 deaths
MEPs for France 1999–2004
MEPs for Massif-central–Centre 2004–2009
Union for a Popular Movement MEPs
20th-century women MEPs for France
21st-century women MEPs for France
Officers of the Ordre national du Mérite